You Can't Escape is a 1957 British drama film directed by Wilfred Eades and starring Noelle Middleton, Guy Rolfe and Robert Urquhart. It is based on the 1938 novel She Died Young by Alan Kennington.

Plot
Rising novelist Peter Darwin (Robert Urquhart) has a row with former mistress Claire (Elizabeth Kentish), and accidentally kills her. He somehow manages to persuades his reluctant fiancé Kay (Noelle Middleton) to help him bury Claire's body in a wood. But when the body is found and a blackmailing journalist (Peter Reynolds) appears on the scene, Darwin resorts to desperate measures to cover his tracks, including framing innocent people.

Cast
 Noelle Middleton as Kay March 
 Guy Rolfe as David Anstruther 
 Robert Urquhart as Peter Darwin 
 Peter Reynolds as Rodney Nixon 
 Elizabeth Kentish as Claire Segar 
 Barbara Cavan as Aunt Sue 
 Martin Boddey as Inspector Crane 
 Thorley Walters as Chadwick 
 Jacqueline Mackenzie as Mrs. Baggerley

Critical reception
TV Guide concluded there was "Nothing much to get excited about"; while My Reviewer found the film "full of action from the off and whilst it all feels a little dated now, it has a certain old school charm – like the very best of ITC shows from back in the day"; and Blueprint Review wrote, "Despite its rather stagey tone You Can’t Escape remains a fun example of British B-movies from that era."

Dated? So what?  If a work is true to its time then it is bound to be dated and that is to its credit, surely?

References

External links
 

1957 films
1957 drama films
Films shot at Associated British Studios
1950s English-language films
British drama films
Films based on British novels
1950s British films